Hester Avenue (previously known as Quinns Road) is an east-west distributor road in the northern suburbs of Perth, Western Australia, located within the City of Wanneroo. It primarily links the coastal suburbs of the Clarkson-Butler region to the arterial highway Wanneroo Road in the east, and is the current (as of August 2017) northern terminus of the Mitchell Freeway.

The road begins as a four-lane dual carriageway at Wanneroo Road, before intersecting with the Mitchell Freeway at Clarkson in the form of an elongated dogbone roundabout separated by a bridge crossing the Joondalup railway line. The road terminates at a roundabout with Marmion Avenue, where it becomes Anchorage Drive North, a local distributor road in the suburb of Mindarie. The speed limit begins at 60 km/h, increasing to 70 km/h at the dual carriageway.

Direct access to the Nowergup Rail Depot is also provided by the road.

History
Hester Avenue was designed in the early 1970s as a new alignment of Quinns Road, an already-existing east-west road that directly linked Wanneroo Road to the coastal townsite of Quinns Rocks. It was named after Thomas Hester, an early settler and local land-owner in the area, whose name was also initially proposed for the adjoining suburb of Merriwa.

The new alignment was first built in 1990 to coincide with the developments of Mindarie and Merriwa by Smith Corporation, running onto the original Quinns Road at the intersection of the future Connolly Drive. The portion of Quinns Road in between Marmion Avenue and Connolly Drive was then closed to general traffic and turned into a cul-de-sac in Merriwa, where it was renamed Palermo Court.

Hester Avenue deviates south-westerly from the original Quinns Road from Connolly Drive onwards, where it runs directly into Mindarie. Quinns Road west of Marmion Avenue survives today as a local distributor road in Quinns Rocks, while the unaltered portion east of Connolly Drive now assumes the name Hester Avenue for its entire length.

The road was built into a dual carriageway from Marmion Avenue to Hidden Valley Retreat, Clarkson, in 2003.

In 2017 the Hester Avenue Bridge was demolished as part of the wider Mitchell Freeway Expansion. Main Roads have confirmed planning is underway for the extension of Mitchell Freeway from Hester Avenue to Romeo Road with works commencing in late 2020.

Intersections
The entire road is in the City of Wanneroo local government area.

See also

References

Roads in Perth, Western Australia